Ahmed Ajlani or Ahmad Al-Ajlani (born 30 November 1960) is a Tunisian former footballer and current head coach of Al-Jabalain.

References

External links
Goal.com Profile
goalzz.com Profile

slstat.com Profile
soccerpunter.com Profile

1960 births
Living people
Tunisian footballers
Association football midfielders
Tunisian football managers
Étoile Sportive du Sahel managers
Khaleej FC managers
Al-Shoulla FC managers
Al-Qadisiyah FC managers
Al-Ta'ee managers
Al Hilal SFC managers
Al Shabab FC (Riyadh) managers
Al-Hazm FC managers
Olympique Club de Khouribga managers
Ittihad Tanger managers
Al Kharaitiyat SC managers
Saudi Professional League managers
Saudi First Division League managers
Tunisian expatriate football managers
Expatriate football managers in Saudi Arabia
Tunisian expatriate sportspeople in Saudi Arabia